Saint Albans Township is one of twenty-four townships in Hancock County, Illinois, USA.  As of the 2010 census, its population was 377 and it contained 169 housing units.

Geography

Cities, towns, villages
 West Point

Landmarks
 Pierce Park

Demographics

School districts
 Community Unit School District 4
 Southeastern Community Unit School District 337

Political districts
 Illinois's 18th congressional district
 State House District 93
 State House District 94
 State Senate District 47

References
 United States Census Bureau 2008 TIGER/Line Shapefiles
 
 United States National Atlas

External links
 City-Data.com
 Illinois State Archives
 Township Officials of Illinois

Townships in Hancock County, Illinois
Townships in Illinois